Zybovka, rural localities in Russia, may refer to:

 Zybovka, Kursk Oblast, a village
 Zybovka, Tula Oblast, a village

 See also
 Zubovka